Pat Walter (born 16 February 1959) is a Canadian rower. He competed in the men's double sculls event at the 1988 Summer Olympics.

References

External links
 

1959 births
Living people
Canadian male rowers
Olympic rowers of Canada
Rowers at the 1988 Summer Olympics
Sportspeople from Calgary
Commonwealth Games medallists in rowing
Commonwealth Games gold medallists for Canada
Rowers at the 1986 Commonwealth Games
Pan American Games medalists in rowing
Pan American Games gold medalists for Canada
Rowers at the 1979 Pan American Games
Medallists at the 1986 Commonwealth Games